On March 28, 1920, a large outbreak of at least 37 tornadoes, 31 of which were significant, took place across the Midwestern and Southern United States. The tornadoes left at least 153 dead and at least 1,215 injured. Most of the fatalities occurred in Georgia (37), Ohio (28), and Indiana (21), while the other states had lesser totals. Little is known about many of the specific tornadoes that occurred, and the list below is only partial.

Severe thunderstorms began developing in Missouri during the early morning hours. The storms moved quickly to the northeast towards Chicago, Illinois.

Background

For the residents of the Great Lakes region and Ohio Valley areas, the only source of weather information was the rather vague forecasts that were issued in the local newspaper the day before or by word of mouth. The use of the word "tornado" was strictly prohibited in public weather forecasting until the 1950s because of the fear and panic it might cause. This policy would come under-fire in the years to come especially after the Tri-State Tornado in 1925 that stands today as the deadliest tornado in American history.

These winds allowed a warm, moist air mass to advect northward from the Gulf of Mexico to the Great Lakes. A strong elevated mixed layer (EML) was present over portions of the warm sector. Meanwhile, a pronounced, eastward-shifting convergence zone, characterised by shifting low-level winds, helped promote the development of vigorous thunderstorms. Observations from Springfield, Illinois, and other weather stations, taken in the wake of the convergence zone, indicated anomalously low relative humidity, suggestive of a strong dry line.

Confirmed tornadoes

La Fox–Elgin, Illinois

The first storm started to spawn killer tornadoes in DeKalb and then Kane counties, starting at 1:05 p.m. CDT. Initially, the tornado destroyed a farmhouse and numerous barns, killing a father and tossing about a baby as it touched down.

Observers occasionally reported a well-defined funnel along the path as the tornado continued into the business district of Elgin, destroying or damaging many structures. It destroyed six businesses, damaged many others, and also "partially wrecked" three churches. Three people died as the rear of a theater collapsed, three more as a brick church tower fell, and one additional as a building façade caved in. Church services had been dismissed just minutes before, saving the lives of parishioners and preventing more deaths in Elgin.

As the tornado left downtown Elgin, it destroyed numerous trees along with 25 homes and damaged 200 other residences. Thereafter, the tornado destroyed two more barns and killed 38 cattle. It then probably dissipated, only to develop into a new tornado. Both isolated tornado and widespread downburst damage was reported as far as Wauconda, killing cattle, damaging farms, and destroying many buildings. The tornado in Elgin was rated F3 in a study and was the first tornado of the outbreak to cause deaths and to kill more than five people.

Channahon–Troy Township–Lockport–Bellwood–Maywood–Melrose Park–Dunning, Illinois

The tornado first destroyed five homes, two frame schools, and at least 12 barns as it passed from Channahon to Troy and thence to Lockport. It skipped thereafter, possibly dissipating and redeveloping into a second tornado, as it caused minor damage in the Romeoville area. Afterward, the tornado funnel was not seen for some time.

Upon reaching the Bellwood-Maywood area, a second tornado probably touched down and produced a continuous damage swath to Lake Michigan, killing 20 people and leveling many homes with F4 damage. 10 of the deaths alone occurred at Melrose Park when the tornado hit Sacred Heart Catholic Church and Convent  The tornado destroyed 50 other buildings in Melrose Park before moving over less-populated areas, killing six more people in the community of Dunning before passing over Lake Michigan. In all, the tornado partially or completely destroyed 413 buildings and injured about 300 people.

Red Hill–Susanna–Red Ridge–Agricola, Alabama/West Point, Georgia

This tornado first developed east of Eclectic between 4:00–4:45 p.m. CDT, but most likely around 3:45 p.m. CDT according to Thomas P. Grazulis. Some damage occurred to homes, trees, outhouses, and a school before the tornado hit Red Hill. Next, the tornado caused at least 17 deaths and destroyed 60 homes in Alabama, mainly near Susanna, Red Ridge, and Agricola. Afterward, it caused nine deaths and 40 injuries in an industrial and business swath of West Point, Georgia, with 40 homes destroyed in Georgia. It became the second-deadliest tornado to hit this day.

Ossian–Townley, Indiana/Brunersburg–Raab Corners, Ohio

The tornadoes that struck the western counties of Darke, Defiance, Mercer, Paulding, and Van Wert in Ohio on March 28, 1920, originated in the Hoosier State, quickly moving across the state line into Ohio.

The first of the tornadoes began in Indiana around 6:15 p.m. EDT. Probably part of a tornado family, it touched down near the Wells County community of Ossian. Increasing rapidly in size and intensity, the tornado was reported by eyewitnesses to have resembled a very large, low-hanging mass of turbulent clouds that resembled boiling pot of oatmeal. This may have accounted for the deaths and injuries of so many farmers within its path, since many farmers were usually accustomed to taking shelter during dangerous weather situations. The tornado caused nine deaths on farms outside Ossian. The tornado then destroyed nearly every building at Townley. Four people died there as the entire town was devastated. The powerful tornado subsequently hit Edgerton before entering Ohio. In Indiana the tornado destroyed numerous farms, leveled at least 100 buildings, killed 13 people, and left behind $1,000,000 in damage (1920 USD) in the state. It later became the first of three tornadoes to move into Ohio, this time from Allen County, Indiana.

After moving through Paulding County, the tornado alternately lifted and dipped to the ground, possibly even reforming as a separate tornado, as it moved into the Defiance area. Here several homes and a small store were destroyed and six people lost their lives. The violent tornado then moved northeast into Henry and Fulton Counties, tearing through the town of Swanton, located near Brunersburg, and causing major damage. Many factories, shops, and homes were completely demolished. According to the Toledo Blade newspaper, the central business district sustained very heavy damage along Main Street, extending into nearby residential areas, where the damage became more intense. This damage brought out many thieves who looted local businesses and houses that had been hit by the tornado. Continuing on, the tornado then caused isolated damage to farms and trees as it passed into rural areas.

Increasing in size as it moved into northwest Lucas County, the tornado produced increasingly severe damage, as buildings and homes were swept clean of their foundations, before leveling the entire community of Raab Corners, also called "Rab's Corners" or "Rabb's Corner", in Lucas County. The residents of Raab Corners were largely unaware of the impending danger as they celebrated Palm Sunday services at the Immaculate Conception and St. Mary's Churches that evening. Just after 8:00 p.m. EDT rain and small hail started to come down in torrents. As the power went out churchgoers lighted kerosene lamps to illuminate the interior of their buildings, and to continue their Palm Sunday services, when the winds began to increase followed by large hail that shattered all the windows. Around 8:15 p.m. EDT, a solid black wall of swirling clouds proceeded to engulf Raab Corners, destroying everything in its path and killing four people. Local residents decided not to rebuild the town, moving to nearby communities in Michigan and Ohio. Today, only an intersection remains at once was the main four corners.

West Liberty–Geneva–Ceylon, Indiana/Van Wert, Ohio

This tornado developed in east-central Indiana and crossed into Mercer and Van Wert counties in Ohio. Upon touching down in Indiana, the tornado severely impacted West Liberty, Indiana (seven deaths), located north-northwest of Portland, before leveling homes between Geneva and Ceylon. In this area, the tornado partially stripped chickens of their feathers—a common phenomenon known as moulting—and many buildings were swept away with their floors slightly dislodged. Thereafter, it leveled farms and killed three people in neighboring Ohio. In this area, the tornado was very intense and may have even reached F5 intensity, being one of the strongest tornadoes recorded this day. After exiting Adams County, Indiana, this large tornado moved towards the far northwestern part of Mercer County in west-central Ohio, again destroying nearly everything in its path. As the tornado moved on into Van Wert County, three more people died and many would be injured as the storm moved to the south of Van Wert. Some of this same area was hit by another F4 tornado on November 10, 2002.

Fenton, Michigan

The third and final F4 tornado in Michigan this day touched down west-northwest of Fenton at about 7:30 p.m. EDT, shortly before "8 o' clock," though one estimate suggested a time of 6:00 p.m. EDT. The tornado first destroyed a barn, a farmhouse, and a school as it moved northeast. It then struck a cement plant and demolished a smokestack and destroyed the steel-framed kiln room, reportedly warping and twisting the steel bars "so badly...that it is probable that the enclosure will have to be rebuilt." Total losses reached $100,000 at the plant. Afterward, the intensifying tornado leveled farm buildings and killed two horses and several other livestock; it left cows unharmed but pinned under debris. The F4 tornado then struck and completely leveled about 30 lakeside summer homes, many of them large and well-built structures worth $3,000–$6,000 to build at the time. In the summer, according to the Fenton Independent, there would have been "hundreds of people camping at the lake. Should the accident have occurred at that time there would have been hundreds of deaths." In all, the powerful tornado killed four people and damaged or destroyed 35 buildings near Fenton. One of the deaths occurred in an overturned car, among the earliest tornado-related deaths in an automobile; the earliest known such death was probably on May 19, 1918, in Iowa.

See also
List of tornadoes and tornado outbreaks
List of North American tornadoes and tornado outbreaks
1965 Palm Sunday tornado outbreak – Catastrophic outbreak that affected the same region as the 1920 outbreak
1994 Palm Sunday tornado outbreak – Produced deadly, long-lived tornadoes over the Southeastern United States

Notes

References

 Press Pool. "Reconstruction Starts In Storm Area Where 22 Died." Toledo Blade. March 31, 1920. Retrieved on April 17, 2001.
 National Oceanic and Atmospheric Administration, National Climatic Data Center / Storm Prediction Center.

F4 tornadoes by date
 ,1920-03-28
Tornadoes of 1920
Tornadoes in Indiana
Tornadoes in Wisconsin
Tornadoes in Alabama
Tornadoes in Ohio
Tornadoes in Georgia (U.S. state)
Tornadoes in Michigan
Tornado outbreaks
Tornado,1920-03-28
1920
March 1920 events